Miguel Amarista (born 30 September 1939) is a Venezuelan boxer. He competed in the men's light welterweight event at the 1960 Summer Olympics.

References

External links
 

1939 births
Living people
Venezuelan male boxers
Olympic boxers of Venezuela
Boxers at the 1960 Summer Olympics
Light-welterweight boxers